Leander Martin Cox (May 7, 1812 – March 19, 1865) was a U.S. Representative from Kentucky.

Born in Cumberland County, Virginia, Cox completed academic studies.
He studied law.
He was admitted to the bar and practiced.
He moved to Flemingsburg, Kentucky.
He served as member of the State house of representatives 1843–1845.
He served as captain in the Third Kentucky Volunteers in the Mexican War in 1847.

Cox was elected as a Whig to the Thirty-third Congress and as a candidate of the American Party to the Thirty-fourth Congress (March 4, 1853 – March 3, 1857).
He was an unsuccessful candidate for reelection in 1856 to the Thirty-fifth Congress.
He resumed the practice of law.
He died in Flemingsburg, Kentucky, March 19, 1865.
He was interred in Fleming County Cemetery.

References

1812 births
1865 deaths
People from Cumberland County, Virginia
Members of the Kentucky House of Representatives
People from Flemingsburg, Kentucky
Whig Party members of the United States House of Representatives from Kentucky
Know-Nothing members of the United States House of Representatives from Kentucky
19th-century American politicians